The Anglo-Australian Near-Earth Asteroid Survey (AANEAS) operated from 1990 to 1996, becoming one of the most prolific programs of its type in the world. Apart from leading to the discovery of 38 near-Earth asteroids, 9 comets, 63 supernovae, several other astronomical phenomena and the delivery of a substantial proportion of all NEA astrometry obtained worldwide (e.g., 30% in 1994–95), AANEAS also led to many other scientific advances which were reported in the refereed literature.

See also
List of asteroid close approaches to Earth
List of near-Earth object observation projects

References
 D. I. Steel, R. H. McNaught, G. J. Garradd, D. J. Asher and K. S. Russell, AANEAS: A Valedictory Report, Australian Journal of Astronomy, 1998

Astronomical surveys
Observational astronomy